Callicarpa americana, the American beautyberry, is an open-habitat, native shrub of the Southern United States which is often grown as an ornamental in gardens and yards. American beautyberries produce large clusters of purple berries, which birds and deer eat, thus distributing the seeds.

Uses
The raw berries, while palatably sweet, are suitable for human consumption only in small amounts, because they are astringent. Some people have reported mild stomach cramps after consumption. The berries are also used in jellies and wine. The roots are used to make herbal tea. As a folk remedy it has been claimed that "fresh, crushed leaves of American beautyberry, Callicarpa americana ... helped keep biting insects away from animals such as horses and mules". A chemical compound isolated from the plant, callicarpenal, was effective as a mosquito repellent in a laboratory experiment using a simulated skin model.

The berries ripen in September through October and are a favorite among wild bird species including cardinals, mockingbirds, finches, woodpeckers and more. Beautyberry is commonly planted in landscape designs to attract wildlife because of the food source the berries provide and the cover animals get from the shrub itself.

Distribution
The native range of C. americana extends from Maryland to Florida, west to Texas and Arkansas, and also Mexico, Bermuda, the Bahamas and Cuba.

Characteristics

Plants with white berries are found in cultivation under the name Callicarpa americana var. lactea; not all authorities recognize this as a distinct variety (in the sense of the botanical rank below subspecies).

Propagation can be accomplished by making traditional cuttings; or germinating fully ripened (purple) seeds in pots or growing flats; or by scattering seeds on bare ground in a suitable area and lightly covering them or stepping on them to gently press them into the soil.

References

External links
American Beautyberry info
USDA Plants Profile
Wildlife Gardening: Beautyberry

americana
Flora of North America
Insect repellents
Plants described in 1753
Taxa named by Carl Linnaeus